This is a list of finalists for the 2017 Archibald Prize for portraiture. As the images are copyright, an external link to an image has been listed where available (listed is Artist – Title).
	
Tony Albert –  Self-portrait (ash on me) 
Jessica Ashton – Self-portrait as a clown  
Kate Beynon – With amulets and their shadows (Self-portrait)
Andrew Bonneau – Portrait of Ayako Saito 
Boys of  Sydney Grammar Edgecliff Preparatory School – Goodbye, Sir! (Portrait of Dr John Vallance)
 Keith Burt –  Bare Tarragh (Portrait of Tarragh Cunningham)
Mitch Cairns – Agatha Gothe-Snape  (Winner of the Archibald Prize 2017)
 Jon Campbell –  Two sunny boys (Peter Oxley and Jeremy Oxley) 
Jun Chen – Ray Hughes 
Yvette Coppersmith – Professor Gillian Triggs 
Tony Costa –  Simon Chan 
Lucy Culliton – Finished packing (Portrait of Steve Peters)
Jonathan Dalton – Lottie and James  (Portrait of Lottie Consalvo and James Drinkwater)
Anh Do –  JC (Portrait of Jack Charles) (Winner of the People's Choice Award 2017) (Image)
 Marc Etherington – Paul (Paul Williams in his studio) 
 Prudence Flint –  The meal (Portrait of Athena Bellas)
Ashley Frost – Janet Dawson at the doorway to her studio 
Andrew Lloyd Greensmith – The inner stillness of Eileen Kramer 
David Griggs –  Twisting Cain with a brown eye while lacking a constitution for darkness (Self-portrait)
Robert Hannaford – Michael Chaney 
Tsering Hannaford – Self-portrait 
Nicholas Harding – John Olsen AO, OBE 
 Sophia Hewson –  Untitled (Richard Bell) 
 Tjungkara Ken – Kungkarangkalpa tjukurpa (Seven Sisters dreaming), a self-portrait 
 Julius Killerby –  Paul Little 
Kim Leutwyler – Heyman (Portrait of Michelle Heyman)
Richard Lewer – Liz Laverty 
Luke, William H – Remy QC (Portrait of Remy van de Wiel)
Robert Malherbe – Self-portrait 
Phil Meatchem – Aah yeah, that guy (Portrait of Francis Greenslade)
Vincent Namatjira – Self-portrait on Friday 
Paul Newton – Portrait of Rupert Myer AO 
Jordan Richardson – John (Portrait of  John Bell)
Dee Smart – The mayor of Bondi (Portrait of John Macarthur)
Peter Smeeth – Lisa Wilkinson AM (Winner of the Packing Room Prize 2017) (Image)
Gerard Smith – Elizabeth St over Hyde Park (Portrait of Helen Littleton)
Loribelle Spirovski – John Bell at home
Vanessa Stockard – Self-portrait as new mum 
Noel Thurgate – Homage to Peter Powditch 
Natasha Walsh – The scent of rain (self-portrait) 
 what – Robert Forster 
Marcus Wills – Protagonist, antagonist (Thomas M Wright) 
Madeleine Winch – Facing the canvas (Self-portrait)

See also 
Previous year: List of Archibald Prize 2016 finalists
Next year: List of Archibald Prize 2018 finalists
List of Archibald Prize winners

References

2017
Archibald
Archibald
Archibald Prize 2017
Archibald Prize 2017
Archibald